South Hutchinson is a city in Reno County, Kansas, United States.  As of the 2020 census, the population of the city was 2,521. It is a south suburb of Hutchinson.

History
The city was founded in 1887 by Benjamin Blanchard of Terre Haute, Indiana.

The first post office in South Hutchinson was established in August 1887.

Geography
South Hutchinson is located at  (38.027185, -97.939769).

Demographics

2010 census
As of the census of 2010, there were 2,457 people, 1,113 households, and 611 families residing in the city. The racial makeup of the city was 91.9% White, 1.1% African American, 1.0% Native American, 0.6% Asian, 0.1% Pacific Islander, 2.3% from other races, and 3.1% from two or more races. Hispanic or Latino people of any race were 6.6% of the population.

There were 1,113 households, of which 24.4% had children under the age of 18 living with them, 39.6% were married couples living together, 10.9% had a female householder with no husband present, 4.4% had a male householder with no wife present, and 45.1% were non-families. 40.3% of all households were made up of individuals, and 19% had someone living alone who was 65 years of age or older. The average household size was 2.08 and the average family size was 2.80.

The median age in the city was 47.7 years. 21.4% of residents were under the age of 18; 6.9% were between the ages of 18 and 24; 18.5% were from 25 to 44; 26.8% were from 45 to 64; and 26.5% were 65 years of age or older. The gender makeup of the city was 45.6% male and 54.4% female.

2000 census
As of the census of 2000, there were 2,539 people, 1,143 households, and 675 families residing in the city. The racial makeup of the city was 93.46% White, 0.79% African American, 0.59% Native American, 0.24% Asian, 0.04% Pacific Islander, 3.23% from other races, and 1.65% from two or more races. Hispanic or Latino people of any race were 5.32% of the population.

There were 1,143 households, out of which 24.8% had children under the age of 18 living with them, 45.8% were married couples living together, 10.7% had a female householder with no husband present, and 40.9% were non-families. 37.5% of all households were made up of individuals, and 19.6% had someone living alone who was 65 years of age or older. The average household size was 2.12 and the average family size was 2.77.

In the city, the population was spread out, with 21.7% under the age of 18, 7.9% from 18 to 24, 24.0% from 25 to 44, 20.8% from 45 to 64, and 25.6% who were 65 years of age or older. The median age was 43 years. For every 100 females, there were 82.3 males. For every 100 females age 18 and over, there were 77.7 males.

The median income for a household in the city was $29,044, and the median income for a family was $37,500. Males had a median income of $30,820 versus $19,779 for females. The per capita income for the city was $17,445. About 9.6% of families and 13.6% of the population were below the poverty line, including 18.4% of those under age 18 and 12.8% of those age 65 or over.

Government
The South Hutchinson government consists of a mayor and five council members, which meets the first and third Monday of each month at 7 p.m.  Pete Murray was elected mayor on May 5, 2014.

Education
The community is served by Nickerson–South Hutchinson USD 309 public school district.

References

Further reading

External links

 
 South Hutchinson - Directory of Public Officials
 South Hutchinson city map, KDOT

Cities in Reno County, Kansas
Cities in Kansas
Populated places established in 1887
Kansas populated places on the Arkansas River
1887 establishments in Kansas